Zhang Yimou (born 2 April 1950) is a Chinese film director, producer, writer, actor and former cinematographer. He is a part of the Fifth Generation of Chinese filmmakers, Honorary Doctorate of Boston University and Yale University, Distinguished Professor of Beijing Film Academy. He made his directorial debut in 1988 with Red Sorghum.

Zhang has won numerous awards and recognitions, with three Academy Awards nominations for Best Foreign Language Film for Ju Dou in 1990, Raise the Red Lantern in 1991, and Hero in 2003; a Silver Lion, two Golden Lion prizes and the Glory to the Filmmaker Award at the Venice Film Festival; Grand Jury Prize, Prize of the Ecumenical Jury and Technical Grand Prize at the Cannes Film Festival; the Golden Bear, the Silver Bear Grand Jury Prize and the Prize of the Ecumenical Jury at the Berlin International Film Festival. In 1993, he was a member of the jury at the 43rd Berlin International Film Festival. Zhang directed the opening and closing ceremonies of the 2008 Beijing Summer Olympic Games as well as the opening and closing ceremonies of the 2022 Beijing Winter Olympic Games, which received considerable international acclaim.

One of Zhang's recurrent themes is the resilience of Chinese people in the face of hardship and adversity, a theme which has been explored in such films as To Live (1994) and Not One Less (1999). His films are particularly noted for their rich use of colour, as can be seen in some of his early films, like Raise the Red Lantern, and in his wuxia films like Hero and House of Flying Daggers. His highest budgeted film to date is the 2016 monster film The Great Wall, set in Imperial China and starring Matt Damon.

Early life
Zhang Yimou was born in Xi'an, the capital of Shaanxi province. Zhang's father, Zhang Bingjun, a dermatologist, had been an officer in the National Revolutionary Army under Chiang Kai-shek during the Chinese Civil War; an uncle and an elder brother had followed the Nationalist forces to Taiwan after their 1949 defeat. Zhang's mother, Zhang Xiaoyou, was a doctor at the 2nd Hospital affiliated Xi'an Jiao Tong University who graduated from Xi'an Medical University. He has two younger brothers, Zhang Weimou and Zhang Qimou. As a result of his family's ties to the Nationalist movement, Zhang faced difficulties in his early life.

During the Cultural Revolution of the 1960s and 1970s, Zhang left his school studies and went to work, first as a farm labourer for 3 years, and later at a cotton textile mill for 7 years in the city of Xianyang. During this time he took up painting and amateur still photography, selling his own blood to buy his first camera. In 1978, he went to Beijing Film Academy and majored in photography. He has an Honorary Doctorate Degree from Boston University and also one from Yale University.

Early career
When the Beijing Film Academy reopened its doors to new students in 1978, following the abandonment of policies adopted during the Cultural Revolution, Zhang, at 27, was over the regulation age for admission, and was without the prerequisite academic qualifications. After a personal appeal to the Ministry of Culture, and showing a portfolio of his personal photographic works, the authorities relented and admitted him to the Faculty  of Cinematography. Zhang graduated with the class of 1982, which also included Chen Kaige, Tian Zhuangzhuang, and Zhang Junzhao. The class went on to form the core of the Fifth Generation, who were a part of an artistic reemergence in China after the end of the Cultural Revolution.

Zhang and his co-graduates were assigned to small regional studios, and Zhang was sent to work for the Guangxi Film Studio as a cinematographer. Though originally intended to work as director's assistants, the graduates soon discovered there was a dearth of directors so soon after the Cultural Revolution, and gained permission to start making their own films. This led to the production of Zhang Junzhao's One and Eight, on which Zhang Yimou worked as director of photography, and Chen Kaige's Yellow Earth, in 1984. These two films were successes at the Hong Kong Film Festival and helped to bring the new Chinese cinema to the attention of worldwide audiences, signaling a departure from the earlier propagandist films of the Cultural Revolution. Yellow Earth is today widely considered the inaugural film of the Fifth Generation directors.

In 1985, after moving back to his home town of Xi'an, Zhang was engaged as cinematographer and lead actor for director Wu Tianming's upcoming film Old Well, which was subsequently released in 1987. The lead role won Zhang a Best Actor award at the Tokyo International Film Festival.

Film director

1980s 
1988 saw the release of Zhang's directorial debut, Red Sorghum, starring Chinese actress Gong Li in her first leading role. Red Sorghum was met with critical acclaim, bringing Zhang to the forefront of the world's art directors, and winning him a Golden Bear for Best Picture at the 38th Berlin International Film Festival in 1988.

Codename Cougar (or The Puma Action), a minor experiment in the political thriller genre, was released in 1989, featuring Gong Li and eminent Chinese actor Ge You. However, it garnered less-than-positive reviews at home and Zhang himself later dismissed the film as his worst.

In the same year, Zhang began work on his next project, the period drama Ju Dou. Starring Gong Li in the eponymous lead role, along with Li Baotian as the male lead, Ju Dou, garnered as much critical acclaim as had Red Sorghum, and became China's first film to be nominated for an Academy Award for Best Foreign Language Film. Ju Dou highlighted the way in which the "gaze" can have different meanings, from voyeurism to ethical appeal.

In 1989, he was a member of the jury at the 16th Moscow International Film Festival.

1990s
After the success of Ju Dou, Zhang began work on Raise the Red Lantern. Based on Su Tong's novel Wives and Concubines, the film depicted the realities of life in a wealthy family compound during the 1920s. Gong Li was again featured in the lead role, her fourth collaboration with Zhang as director.

Raise the Red Lantern received almost unanimous international acclaim. Film critic Roger Ebert of the Chicago Sun-Times noted its "voluptuous physical beauty" and sumptuous use of colours. Gong Li's acting was also praised as starkly contrasting with the roles she played in Zhang's earlier films. Raise the Red Lantern was nominated in the Best Foreign Language Film category at the 1992 Academy Awards, becoming the second Chinese film to earn this distinction (after Zhang's Ju Dou). It eventually lost out to Gabriele Salvatores's Mediterraneo.

Zhang's next directorial work, The Story of Qiu Ju, in 1992, once again starring Gong Li in the lead role. The film, which tells the tale of a peasant woman seeking justice for her husband after he was beaten by a village official, was a hit at film festivals and won the Golden Lion award at the 1992 Venice Film Festival.

Next, Zhang directed To Live, an epic film based on the novel by Yu Hua of the same name. To Live highlighted the resilience of the ordinary Chinese people, personified by its two main characters, amidst three generations of upheavals throughout Chinese politics of the 20th century. It was banned in China, but released at the 1994 Cannes Film Festival and won the Grand Jury Prize, as well as earning a Best Actor prize for Ge You. To Live was officially banned but still shown in theaters in China.

Shanghai Triad followed in 1995, featuring Gong Li in her seventh film under Zhang's direction. The two had developed a romantic as well as a professional relationship, but this would end during production of Shanghai Triad. Zhang and Gong would not work together again until 2006's Curse of the Golden Flower.

1997 saw the release of Keep Cool, a black comedy film about life in modern China. Keep Cool marked only the second time Zhang had set a film in the modern era, after The Story of Qiu Ju.

As in The Story of Qiu Ju, Zhang returned to the neorealist habit of employing non-professional actors and location shooting for Not One Less in 1999 which won him his second Golden Lion prize in Venice.

Shot immediately after Not One Less, Zhang's 1999 film  The Road Home featured a new leading lady in the form of the young actress Zhang Ziyi, in her film debut. The film is based on a simple throw-back narrative centering on a love story between the narrator's parents.

2000–present

Happy Times, a relatively unknown film by Zhang, was based loosely on the short story Shifu: You'll Do Anything for a Laugh, by Mo Yan. Starring popular Chinese actor Zhao Benshan and actress Dong Jie, it was an official selection for the Berlin International Film Festival in 2002.

Zhang's next major project was the ambitious wuxia drama Hero, released in China in 2002. With an impressive lineup of Asian stars, including Jet Li, Maggie Cheung, Tony Leung Chiu-Wai, Zhang Ziyi, and Donnie Yen, Hero told a fictional tale about Ying Zheng, the King of the State of Qin (later to become the first Emperor of China), and his would-be assassins. The film was released in North America in 2004, two years after its Chinese release, by American distributor Miramax Films, and became a huge international hit. Hero was one of the few foreign-language films to debut at number 1 at the U.S. box office, and was one of the nominees for Best Foreign Language Film at the 2003 Academy Awards.

Zhang followed up the huge success of Hero with another martial arts epic, House of Flying Daggers, in 2004. Set in the Tang Dynasty, it starred Zhang Ziyi, Andy Lau, and Takeshi Kaneshiro as characters caught in a dangerous love triangle. House of Flying Daggers received acclaim from critics, who noted the use of colour that harked back to some of Zhang's earlier works.

Released in China in 2005, Riding Alone for Thousands of Miles was a return to the more low-key drama that characterized much of Zhang's middle period pieces. The film stars Japanese actor Ken Takakura, as a father who wishes to repair relations with his alienated son, and is eventually led by circumstance to set out on a journey to China. Zhang had been an admirer of Takakura for over thirty years.

2006's Curse of the Golden Flower saw him reunited with leading actress Gong Li. Taiwanese singer Jay Chou and Hong Kong star Chow Yun-fat also starred in the period epic based on a play by Cao Yu.

Zhang's recent films, and his involvement with the 2008 Olympic ceremonies, have not been without controversy. Some critics claim that his recent works, contrary to his earlier films, have received approval from the Chinese government. However, in interviews, Zhang has said that he is not interested in politics, and that it was an honour for him to direct the Olympic ceremonies because it was "a once-in-a-lifetime opportunity."

In 2008, he won a Peabody Award "for creating a spell-binding, unforgettable celebration of the Olympic promise, featuring a cast of thousands" at the opening ceremony of the Beijing Olympics.

On 24 May 2010, Zhang was awarded an honorary Doctor of Fine Arts degree by Yale University, and was described as "a genius with camera and choreography."

Zhang's 2011 The Flowers of War was his most expensive film to date, budgeting for $90.2 million, until his 2016 The Great Wall surpassed it with a budget of $150 million.

After the mixed reception and financial disappointment of The Great Wall, Zhang returned in 2018 with the critically acclaimed Shadow, which received 12 nominations at the 55th Golden Horse Awards and eventually won four, including Best Director.

Critical Reception

Reception of Zhang Yimou's films has been mixed. While some critics praise his striking aesthetics and ability to break into the Western art market, some Chinese-based critics have attacked Zhang for pandering to Western audiences and portraying China as weak, exotic, and vulnerable.

Stage direction
Starting in the 1990s, Zhang Yimou has been directing stage productions in parallel with his film career.

In 1998, he directed an acclaimed version of Puccini's opera Turandot, firstly in Florence and then later Turandot at the Forbidden City, Beijing, with Zubin Mehta conducting, the latter documented in the film The Turandot Project (2000). He reprised his version of Turandot in October 2009, at the Bird's Nest Stadium in Beijing, and plans to tour with the production in Europe, Asia and Australia in 2010.

In 2001, Zhang adapted his 1991 film Raise the Red Lantern for the stage, directing a ballet version.

Zhang has co-directed a number of outdoor folk musicals under the title Impression. These include Impression, Liu Sanjie, which opened in August 2003 at the Li River, Guangxi province; Impression Lijiang, in June 2006 at the foot of Jade Dragon Snow Mountain in Lijiang, Yunnan province; Impression West Lake, in late 2007 at the West Lake in Hangzhou, Zhejiang province; Impression Hainan in late 2009, set in Hainan Island; and Impression Dahongpao set on Mount Wuyi, in Fujian province. All five performances were co-directed by Wang Chaoge and Fan Yue.

Zhang also led the production of Tan Dun's opera, The First Emperor, which had its world premiere at the Metropolitan Opera on 21 December 2006.
In 2017 he directed an innovative ballet titled ‘’2047 Apologue’’, where the 12 minute solo finale The Weaving Machine was choreographed by Rose Alice Larkings and including hundreds of LED lamps. Onstage as Rose Alice danced the 12 minute solo was an elderly Chinese weaver at her loom, highlighting the old crafts and industries which remain so important in a world of new technology.

2008 and 2022 Beijing Olympics opening and closing ceremonies
Zhang Yimou was chosen to direct the Beijing portion of the closing ceremonies of the 2004 Summer Olympics in Athens, Greece, as well as the opening and closing ceremonies of the 2008 Summer Olympics in Beijing, China, alongside co-director and choreographer Zhang Jigang.

Zhang was a runner-up for the Time Magazine Person of the Year award in 2008. Steven Spielberg, who withdrew as an adviser to the Olympic ceremonies to pressure China into helping with the conflict in Darfur, described Zhang's works in the Olympic ceremonies in Time magazine, saying "At the heart of Zhang's Olympic ceremonies was the idea that the conflict of man foretells the desire for inner peace. This theme is one he's explored and perfected in his films, whether they are about the lives of humble peasants or exalted royalty. This year he captured this prevalent theme of harmony and peace, which is the spirit of the Olympic Games.  In one evening of visual and emotional splendor, he educated, enlightened, and entertained us all."

On 7 January 2022, it was reported that Zhang Yimou has once again chosen to direct the opening and closing ceremonies of the 2022 Winter Olympics and 2022 Winter Paralympics, which would be once again held in Beijing, China.

Investigation relating to possible violations of One Child Policy
Associated Press reported on 9 May 2013 that Zhang was being investigated for violating China's one-child policy. AP reported that he had allegedly fathered 7 children with 4 women, and faced large potential fines.

According to the mainstream media in China, Zhang married Chen Ting, who is a dancer in December 2011; she had three children with him. However, when the news came out, Zhang had no immediate response. On 29 November 2013, under pressure from the public and criticism on the Internet, Zhang's studio released a statement that acknowledged Chen Ting and their three children. On 9 January 2014, the Lake District Family Planning Bureau, in accord with China's one-child policy, said Zhang was required to pay an unplanned birth and social maintenance fee totaling RMB 7.48 million (roughly US$1.2 million). On 7 February 2014, it was reported that Zhang had paid the fee.

Filmography

As director

As cinematographer

As actor

See also
 Yimou girl
 Cinema of China
 Fukuoka Asian Culture Prize
 Zhang Jigang

References

Further reading
 Gateward, Frances (editor): Zhang Yimou: Interviews Conversations with Filmmakers Series, University Press of Mississippi, 2001. .
 Colamartino, Fabrizio & Marco Dalla Gassa : "Il cinema di Zhang Yimou" Le Mani, 2003, . (Italian)

External links

Zhang Yimou at Senses of Cinema's Great Directors Critical Database
Zhang Yimou at the Hong Kong Movie Database

Interviews and articles
Text of interview with Zhang Yimou, 2002
Zhang Yimou's Interview on the Southern Weekend on 14 August 2008.
Music from the Films of Zhang Yimou

Zhang Yimou for Jean Paul Gaultier

Filmmakers who won the Best Foreign Language Film BAFTA Award
Beijing Film Academy alumni
Chinese cinematographers
Film directors from Shaanxi
Artists from Xi'an
1951 births
Living people
Directors of Golden Bear winners
Directors of Golden Lion winners
Chevaliers of the Ordre des Arts et des Lettres
Chinese film directors
Members of the 9th Chinese People's Political Consultative Conference
Members of the 10th Chinese People's Political Consultative Conference
Members of the 11th Chinese People's Political Consultative Conference
Asia Game Changer Award winners
Writers from Xi'an
Male actors from Xi'an
20th-century Chinese male actors
21st-century Chinese male actors